Cymbospondylidae is an extinct family of Hueneosaurian Ichthyosaurs known from the Middle Triassic of Europe, North America, and Asia.

Taxonomy
Cymbospondylidae is a basal clade of ichthyosaurs. In 2000, Maischand and Matzke recovered cymbospondylids as members of Hueneosauria and more derived than mixosaurids, but Ji and colleagues found cymbospondylids to be outside of Hueneosauria in 2015. These two studies defined the group in two different ways, with the former defining it as the least inclusive clade containing both Cymbospondylus petrinus and Phantomosaurus neubigi, whereas the latter defined it as the least inclusive clade containing both Cymbospondylus piscosus and Xinminosaurus catactes.

References

Middle Triassic ichthyosaurs
Late Triassic ichthyosaurs
Prehistoric reptile families